Lisle is a commune in the Dordogne department in Nouvelle-Aquitaine in southwestern France.

History
In October 1537, the town was badly damaged by a company of Gascon recruits under Joachim de Montluc, brother of the more famous Blaise de Montluc. Unpaid and unfed, the troops had demanded "free quarter", which was refused.

Population

Amenities
Lisle has a kindergarten and a primary school, a church, a square in front of the town hall and another called La Place des Banquettes. It is well-served commercially with a bakery, a bar/bistrot, a bar/hotel/restauran, a butchers, a pharmacy, a post office, a beauticians, 2 hairdressers, Spar mini supermarket, Credit Agricole cashpoint and a high quality restaurant on the banks of the Dronne river, Le Moulin du Pont. There is also a health centre with 2 doctors, a dentist, physiotherapist, podiatrist and other medical practitioners . A taxi/ambulance/funeral service is also available in Lisle.

Events
It is quite an active village with the Comite des Fetes and Amicale Laique organising events throughout the year including the four-day Fete de la St Roch  the weekend contains or just after the 15th of August.

See also
Communes of the Dordogne department

References

Sources

External links

 Official Mairie's website for Lisle

Communes of Dordogne